Zhangmutou is a town under the direct jurisdiction of the prefecture-level city of Dongguan in Guangdong province, China.

Overview
It is named for the abundant camphor trees which existed at one time. It has many flats built and tailored toward expats. It is also a favorite retirement destination and attracts Hong Kong residents as the price is much lower than nearby Hong Kong. The predominant spoken languages are Hakka, Mandarin and Cantonese.

See also
 Zhangmutou railway station

Notes

References

External links
Official website of Zhangmutou government 
Zhangmutou on sun0769.com 

Geography of Dongguan
Towns in Guangdong